Majid Usman (born 31 August 1953) is a former Pakistani cricketer who played first-class cricket from 1969 to 1973. He toured with the Pakistan cricket team in the 1972–73 season but did not play Test cricket.

A medium-fast bowler, Usman made his first-class debut in September 1969 in the Quaid-e-Azam Trophy. Two matches later, he took 5 for 47 in the second innings of Lahore A’s victory over Peshawar in the Ayub Trophy. He opened the bowling with Imran Khan for Lahore Under-19s when they won the national Under-19 championship in 1970–71.

Usman was selected as one of the 17 men that made up the Pakistan team that toured Australia and New Zealand from November 1972 to March 1973. He played only three first-class matches on the tour, all in New Zealand against Plunket Shield teams, taking seven wickets. That was the end of his first-class career, at the age of 19.

References

External links
 

1953 births
Living people
Pakistani cricketers
Cricketers from Lahore
Lahore cricketers